Agivey Monastery was an early monastic site in Northern Ireland.

It was purportedly founded in the 7th century by Goarcus of Aghadowey. It subsequently became a dependency of the Abbey of St. Mary-de-la-Fonta, which was founded in 1172 and to which this district became a grange.

The monastery was dissolved in 1604, and the land was granted to the Ironmongers’ Company of London.

References

Monasteries in Northern Ireland